The 20th Anniversary of the Summer of Love 1987–1967 is a compilation album by various artists, released in 1987 by Shimmy Disc.

Track listing

Personnel 
Adapted from The 20th Anniversary of the Summer of Love 1987–1967 liner notes.
 Fred Frith – production (A2)
 Kramer – production, engineering
 Juan Maciel – production (B11)
 Chris Nelson – production (B4)

Release history

References

External links 
 

1987 compilation albums
Albums produced by Kramer (musician)
Shimmy Disc compilation albums